New Brighton, New South Wales, is a small town located north-west of Ocean Shores. It includes a soccer field home to the Shores United Soccer Club and is very close to the Ocean Shores Public School located in North Ocean Shores. At the 2016 census, New Brighton had a population of 356 people.

History
North Beach, an area comprising the modern-day seaside town of New Brighton, was a popular mecca for surfing and picnics. However, on 6 May 1849, the schooner Swift en route from Brisbane to Sydney, was drifted ashore to a beach by a fierce cyclone.

Together along with the nearby towns of North Ocean Shores and South Golden Beach, almost 95 percent of New Brighton has become free of gas fields.

Geography
New Brighton is located in the short north of Ocean Shores, New South Wales. It lies within vast bushland and sits between the sandy stretch of the Pacific coast and the banks of Marshalls Creek.

References

Northern Rivers
Towns in New South Wales